Patrick James Hughes (born March 25, 1955) is a Canadian former ice hockey forward.

Hughes was born in Calgary, Alberta. After playing college hockey at the University of Michigan, he started his National Hockey League (NHL) career with the Montreal Canadiens in 1978. He later played for the Pittsburgh Penguins, Edmonton Oilers, Buffalo Sabres, St. Louis Blues and Hartford Whalers. He retired after the 1987 season. Hughes won the Stanley Cup with Montreal in 1979, and with the Oilers in 1984 and 1985. He was inducted into the Etobicoke Sports Hall of Fame in 2007.

On February 3, 1984, while playing with the Edmonton Oilers, Hughes became only the 34th player in the first seven decades of the NHL to score five goals in a game, accomplishing the feat in a 10–5 wipeout of the Calgary Flames, another penalty-filled installment of the Battle of Alberta.

After his playing career, Hughes embarked upon a 20-year career with the Ann Arbor Police Department, but has since retired from the force.

Career statistics

Awards and achievements
1978–79 - NHL - Stanley Cup (Montreal)
1983–84 - NHL - Stanley Cup (Edmonton)
1984–85 - NHL - Stanley Cup (Edmonton)

References

External links

1955 births
Living people
Buffalo Sabres players
Calgary Cowboys draft picks
Canadian ice hockey forwards
Edmonton Oilers players
Hartford Whalers players
Michigan Wolverines men's ice hockey players
Montreal Canadiens draft picks
Montreal Canadiens players
Nova Scotia Voyageurs players
Pittsburgh Penguins players
Rochester Americans players
St. Louis Blues players
Ice hockey people from Calgary
Stanley Cup champions